Alfred Davies may refer to:

Politicians
Alfred Davies (Carmarthen MP) (1848–1907), British Liberal Party politician, Member of Parliament for Carmarthen 1900–1906
Sir Alfred Davies (Lincoln MP) (1881–1941), MP for Lincoln 1918–1924
Alfred Davies (Labour politician) (1871–1940), British Labour Party politician, Member of Parliament for Clitheroe 1918–1922

Footballers
Alfred Davies (footballer) (1850–1891), Welsh amateur footballer, played for Wrexham
Alfred Owen Davies, Welsh footballer, played for Crewe Alexandra F.C.

Other people
 Sir Alfred Davies (civil servant) (1861–1949), education official
Alf Davies (died 1951), Welsh trade unionist